Gerardo Alcántara Martín (born February 4, 1980) is a Mexican football manager and former player. He was born in Coyoacán, Mexico City.

External links

1980 births
Living people
Mexican football managers
Altamira F.C. players
Club Universidad Nacional footballers
Lobos BUAP footballers
Liga MX players
Ascenso MX players
Footballers from Mexico City
Association football midfielders
Mexican footballers